This World Is Not My Home may refer to:
 This World Is Not My Home (Onward to Olympas album)
 This World Is Not My Home (Lone Justice album)